Diaphus burtoni is a species of lanternfish found in the Philippines and the Western Central Pacific Ocean.

Etymology
The fish is named in honor of Edward Milby Burton (1898–1977), who was the Director of the Charleston Museum, South Carolina, who collected the local fishes for his museum and invited Fowler to study them.

References

Myctophidae
Taxa named by Henry Weed Fowler
Fish described in 1934